Wagon Tracks West is a 1943 American Western film directed by Howard Bretherton, written by William Lively, and starring Wild Bill Elliott, George "Gabby" Hayes, Tom Tyler, Anne Jeffreys, Rick Vallin and Robert Frazer. It was released on August 19, 1943, by Republic Pictures.

Plot

Cast  
Wild Bill Elliott as Wild Bill Elliott
George "Gabby" Hayes as Gabby
Tom Tyler as Clawtooth
Anne Jeffreys as Moon Hush
Rick Vallin as Dr. John Fleetwing
Robert Frazer as Robert Warren
Roy Barcroft as Henchman Laird
Charles Miller as Brown Bear
Tom London as Lem Martin
Cliff Lyons as Henchman Matt
Jack Rockwell as Sheriff Summers

References

External links
 

1943 films
American Western (genre) films
1943 Western (genre) films
Republic Pictures films
Films directed by Howard Bretherton
American black-and-white films
1940s English-language films
1940s American films